Elephant in the Room is a 2016 Nigerian romantic comedy film directed by Asurf Oluseyi, and starring Ramsey Nouah and Zainab Sheriff in lead roles. The film, which was shot and set in Sierra Leone, was released on 8 January 2016.

Cast
Ramsey Nouah as Benjamin Bangura
Zainab Sheriff as  Carolina George
Michael Bony Bassey as Benjamin Bangura Jr

References

2010s English-language films